Albrecht Julius Theodor Bethe (25 April 1872 in Stettin – 19 October 1954 in Frankfurt am Main) was a German physiologist. He was the father of physicist Hans Bethe (1906–2005).

He studied at the universities of Freiburg, Munich (under Richard Hertwig), Berlin and Strasbourg (under Friedrich Goltz and Ernst Julius Richard Ewald); receiving his PhD in 1895 at Munich. From 1896 to 1911 he worked at the institute of physiology in Strasbourg, where in 1898 he obtained his doctorate in medicine. In 1911 he became a professor of physiology at the University of Kiel, and four years later, relocated as a professor to the University of Frankfurt. In 1937 he was relieved of his professorial duties at Frankfurt (his wife was deemed to be half-Jewish by the Nazis), only to have them reinstated following the end of wartime hostilities in Europe.

He is well known for his studies involving the nervous system of invertebrates. He believed in the "plasticity" of the nervous system, asserting that if one part of the brain is damaged, another part could learn the functions of the damaged portion.

He was a co-editor of Pflüger's Archiv für die gesamte Physiologie (from 1918 onward) and of the Handbuch der normalen und pathologischen Physiologie (1925–32).

The young physician Rose Hölscher made a silhouette of him, published in the 1921 booklet Frankfurter Charakterköpfe with portraits of prominent Frankfurt physicians.

Selected works 
 Formaldehyd! Nicht Formol oder Formalin, 1895.
 Eine neue Methode der Methylenblaufixation, 1896.
 Allgemeine Anatomie und Physiologie des Nervensystems, 1903.
 Handbuch der normalen und pathologischen Physiologie, mit Berücksichtigung der experimentellen Pharmakologie (multi-volume, with Gustav von Bergmann, Gustav Georg Embden and Alexander Ellinger); from 1925 onward.

References 

1872 births
1954 deaths
Physicians from Szczecin
Ludwig Maximilian University of Munich alumni
Academic staff of Goethe University Frankfurt
Academic staff of the University of Strasbourg
Academic staff of the University of Kiel
German physiologists